The dilated false shieldback (Aroegas dilatatus) is a species of katydid that is only known from the Mariepskop Forest in Mpumalanga province, South Africa.

References

Tettigoniidae
Endemic insects of South Africa
Vulnerable animals
Insects described in 1996